The Kharkiv State School of Art is an educational institution in Kharkiv, Ukraine. It accepts a new class of students each year for instruction in the subjects of visual arts education, sculpture, decorative arts, graphic design, and landscape architecture.

History 
The Kharkiv Art School was formally established in 1896 by the Kharkiv city government, based on the previous private art school of Maria Raevskaia-Ivanova. In 1912, the school reopened in a new specially-designed building by architect K. Zhukov in the modernist style with contemporary influences from older Ukrainian buildings. The first director of the new school was Alexander Lubimov, a student of Ilya Repin. The teachers were also alumni of Repin's workshop at the Imperial Academy of Arts in Saint Petersburg.

In 1913, the school was managed by Semyon Prokhorov, formerly head of the Art School in Tomsk, Russia. In 1914, Gavriil Gorelov became its principal, followed by Aleksey Kokel in 1916. A faculty of architecture was added 1925.

Faculties 
 Design
 Visual art
 Sculpture
 Theatrical art
 Architecture

Famous educators 
 Aleksey Kokel - taught 1916-1921
 Volodymyr Starikov - taught 1982-2010
 Leonid Andrievskyi - taught 1938-1941, 1945-1947
 Sergey Besedin - studied 1923-1929, taught 1929-1941

Famous graduates 
 Natalia Verhun - 1953-1958
 Aleksandr Deyneka - 1915-1917
 Sergey Kamennoy - 1974-1978
 Hryhoriy Matsehora - graduated 1957
 Leonid Chernov - graduated 1941

References

External links 
 Official website

Art schools in Ukraine
Buildings and structures in Kharkiv
Universities and colleges in Kharkiv